Karnataka State Cricket Association (KSCA) is the governing body of Cricket in the Indian state of Karnataka. The association is affiliated to the Board of Control for Cricket in India and governs the Karnataka cricket team. The association was founded in 1933 and has been affiliated to the BCCI ever since. The KSCA operates the M. Chinnaswamy Stadium in Bangalore, which hosts International level Test, ODI and T20 cricket matches. It also operates a newly built stadium in Hubli and Belagavi.

History
The Karnataka State Cricket Association was formerly known as Mysore Cricket Association. This association was founded during the year 1933 and gained affiliation to the Board of Control for Cricket in India (BCCI) in 1934. Prof JC Rollo, Justice Mr P. Medappa, Capt. T Murari, Major YVK Murthy and Capt. MG Vijayasarathi were instrumental in getting the KSCA affiliated to the BCCI. JC Rollo, an Englishman, was the first president of the Association. The association was initially housed in a small room in the pavilion of Central college. In the 1950s and 1960s, the association was headed by SA Srinivasan and M.Chinnswamy. In 1975, KSCA made its home in KSCA stadium, where it is housed currently. Bangalore hosted its first ever international test match in the same year against the visiting West Indies. This cricket stadium, earlier named KSCA stadium is now named after Mr. M. Chinnaswamy, who was the Hon. Secretary of the association from 1953 to 1978 and remained the president till 1990.

Mysore state (which was renamed Karnataka in 1973) played its first Ranji trophy match on 4 November 1934 against Madras state (now Tamil Nadu). This was the first ever Ranji trophy game and till date the only Ranji trophy game, which was completed in a single day, with Mysore losing the game.

M Chinnaswamy Stadium, Bengaluru

The M.Chinnaswamy Stadium in Bengaluru is owned by the Government of Karnataka and has been leased out to KSCA for promoting cricket. This stadium was earlier called as Karnataka State Cricket Association stadium (KSCA Stadium) and was later rechristened in tribute to Mr. M. Chinnaswamy who had served the KSCA for four decades and was president of Board of Control for Cricket in India (BCCI) from 1977–1980. The stadium has been one of the premier cricket stadiums of India. Flanked by picturesque Cubbon Park and uptown MG Road, this three-decade-old stadium is situated in the heart of the city of Bengaluru. This 55,000 capacity stadium not only regularly hosts Tests, One Day International and other first class matches, but also other musical and cultural events. The stadium is the home ground of the Karnataka state cricket team and Royal Challengers Bangalore.

According to their latest Annual Report, the KSCA is the first stadium in the world to employ solar photovoltaic system to covering nearly 45000 sq.ft of the east stand. It generates nearly 1,468,000 units in three years. In another first, the stadium installed an efficient sub-air system. This ensures that water from the field is drained in about eight minutes, after light to moderate rain showers.

D.R.Bendre KSCA Stadium Rajnagar, Hubli

The stadium has more than 50,000 capacity and was inaugurated by the then Chief Minister of Karnataka, Shri Jagadish Shettar in November 2012 at Rajnagar, Hubli owned by Karnataka State Cricket Association. Already divisional matches like U-16, U-19, KPL, Ranji Trophy are being hosted here. Efforts are on to build three more international stadiums in Manipal, Raichur & Belgaum Karnataka by KSCA.

Gangotri Glades in Mysore (also called SDNR Wadeyar Stadium) is also being developed to host international matches.

Institutional members
The following sports clubs have been elected as Institutional members of KSCA:

 Zone – Jawahar Sports Club, Select Cricket Club, Bangalore Cricketers, Malleshwaram United Cricket Club, Swastika Union CC and Mount Joy CC.
 Mysore Zone – The Mysore Gymkhana.
 Shimoga Zone – Durgigudi SC.
 Dharwar Zone – Hubli SC.
 Raichur Zone – City XI Cricket Club

Current Office bearers

The following members were elected to the KSCA during the recently concluded elections.

President:  Raguram bhat

Secretary: Shankar A

Treasurer: Jayram

Managing Committee
Yauraj
Vinay mode

Manjunatha raju

References

External links
Website of the Karnataka State Cricket Association

Cricket administration in India
1933 establishments in India
Cricket in Karnataka
Sports organizations established in 1933